TJ Faiane (born 24 August 1995) is a New Zealand rugby union player who currently plays as a midfield back for  in New Zealand's domestic Mitre 10 Cup and the  in the international Super Rugby competition.

Early career

A teenage prodigy, Faiane made a big impression playing first XV rugby for Saint Kentigern College in Auckland, helping them win 3 successive 1A Championship titles.

Senior career

Aged just 18, Faiane was named in the Auckland squad for the 2014 ITM Cup, and he went on to make 7 appearances for them during the season, 5 of which were from the start.   Injuries ruled him out of the 2015 and 2016 seasons so he has so far been unable to add to his seven provincial caps.

Super Rugby

Despite missing the entire 2015 New Zealand domestic season through injury, new  head-coach Tana Umaga sprang a surprise ahead of the 2016 Super Rugby season when he named Faiane as a member of the franchise's wider training group.   Once again injuries hindered him and he didn't make any appearances during the year.   Despite this, he was given a full contract for the 2017 season.

International

Faiane represented New Zealand schools in 2013 and was a member of the New Zealand Under 20 squads which competed in the 2014 and 2015 World Rugby Under 20 Championships, finishing in 3rd and 1st places respectively.

Career Honours

New Zealand Under-20

World Rugby Under 20 Championship - 2015

References

1995 births
New Zealand rugby union players
New Zealand sportspeople of Samoan descent
Rugby union centres
Auckland rugby union players
Blues (Super Rugby) players
People educated at Saint Kentigern College
Living people
Rugby union players from Auckland
Hino Red Dolphins players